Yukie Koizumi (born 24 January 1958) is a Japanese former professional tennis player.

Koizumi reached a best singles ranking of 159 in the world and featured three times in the main draw of the Australian Open. In the 1989 edition she upset ninth seed Lori McNeil in the first round. As a doubles player she also played in the main draws of the French Open and Wimbledon.

ITF finals

Singles: 1 (0–1)

Doubles: 1 (1–0)

References

External links
 
 

1958 births
Living people
Japanese female tennis players
20th-century Japanese women
21st-century Japanese women